Adriana is a feminine given name. It may also refer to:

820 Adriana, an exceptionally dark asteroid from the outer region of the asteroid belt, about 59 kilometers in diameter
Adriana (plant), a plant genus in the family Euphorbiaceae
HSC Adriana, a Croatian ship
MS Adriana, mid-sized cruise ship
Adriana (TV series), Mexican telenovela
Adriana (footballer, born 1968), a Brazilian former footballer
Adriana Leal da Silva (born 1996), a Brazilian footballer
Adriana Martín (born 1986), a Spanish footballer commonly known as Adriana
Adriana, 2013 Indonesian film